Route 212 or Highway 212 can refer to:

Canada
 Manitoba Provincial Road 212
 Newfoundland and Labrador Route 212
 Nova Scotia Route 212
 Prince Edward Island Route 212
 Quebec Route 212
 Saskatchewan Highway 212

China
 China National Highway 212

Costa Rica
 National Route 212

India
 National Highway 212

Ireland
 R212 regional road

Japan
 Japan National Route 212

United States
 U.S. Route 212
 Alabama State Route 212
 California State Route 212 (former)
 Florida State Road 212
 Georgia State Route 212
 Iowa Highway 212
 K-212 (Kansas highway)
 Kentucky Route 212
 Maine State Route 212
 Maryland Route 212
 M-212 (Michigan highway)
 Minnesota State Highway 212 (former)
 Montana Secondary Highway 212
 New Mexico State Road 212
 New York State Route 212
 North Carolina Highway 212
 Ohio State Route 212
 Oregon Route 212
 Pennsylvania Route 212
 South Carolina Highway 212
 Tennessee State Route 212
 Texas State Highway 212 (former)
 Utah State Route 212
 Virginia State Route 212
 Wyoming Highway 212
Territories
 Puerto Rico Highway 212